St. Luke's Church is a Grade II* listed parish church on Parliament Street in Derby in the Church of England.

History
The church was erected between 1868 and 1871 to designs by the architects Henry Isaac Stevens and Frederick Josias Robinson. The church was consecrated on Saturday 24 June 1871 by the Bishop of Lichfield George Selwyn. In the 1880s, a mission church of St George was opened in the Firs Estate.

St Luke's is a traditional Anglo-Catholic church. It is a member of Forward in Faith, an Anglo-Catholic organisation that opposes the ordination of women and liberal attitudes to homosexuality. It is under the alternative episcopal oversight of the Bishop of Ebbsfleet. on 1 April 2017, St Luke's joined with another Anglo-Catholic Derby church, St Bartholomew's in Allenton, to form a united benefice of St Batholomew and St Luke.

Organ

A temporary organ was obtained when the church was first opened, but resources were found to purchase a new three-manual organ from Abbott of Leeds and this was opened on 18 October 1881. A specification of the current organ can be found on the National Pipe Organ Register.

Organists

Henry Houseley 1870 –1882
George Bramley 1882 - 1884
Arthur Rawlinson Wood 1884 -1901
Norman Hibbert 1901 - 1912 (afterwards organist of St Werburgh's Church, Derby)
Arthur Griffin Claypole  1912 – 1914 
A W Wilford 1915 - 1918
Arthur Griffin Claypole 1918 – 1921
A.H. Fithyan 1921 - 1924
Alban Claughton 1924 - 1925
Fred Morley 1925 - 1927 (afterwards organist of All Saints' Church, Ripley)
Horace Barker 1927 - 1933
Hubert Henry Norsworthy 1933 - 1942
Colin William Mellor 1963–77

References

External links
St Bartholomew and St Luke website

Churches completed in 1871
Derby
Grade II* listed buildings in Derby
Churches in Derby
Grade II* listed churches in Derbyshire
Luke
Derby